Revival is the first album by American singer-songwriter Gillian Welch, released on April 9, 1996. Revival was nominated for the 1997 Grammy Award for Best Contemporary Folk Album.

The plant described in the song, "Acony Bell" appears to be Shortia galacifolia, also known as the Oconee bells. Welch later began her own record label under the name Acony. To celebrate the album's 20th anniversary, Welch re-released Revival as Boots No 1: The Official Revival Bootleg which included demos, outtakes and alternate versions of the tracks in addition to eight new songs.

Reception

Mark Deming of Allmusic called it a "superb debut" and wrote, "Welch's debts to artists of the past are obvious and clearly acknowledged, but there's a maturity, intelligence, and keen eye for detail in her songs you wouldn't expect from someone simply trying to ape the Carter Family." Bill Friskics-Warren of No Depression praised the album as "breathtakingly austere evocations of rural culture." Ann Powers of Rolling Stone gave Revival a lukewarm review and criticized Welch for not singing of her own experiences, and "manufacturing emotion." Robert Christgau wrote Welch "just doesn't have the voice, eye, or way with words to bring her simulation off."

Track listing
"Orphan Girl"  – 3:57
"Annabelle"  – 4:03
"Pass You By"  – 3:57
"Barroom Girls"  – 4:14
"One More Dollar"  – 4:34
"By the Mark"  – 3:40
"Paper Wings"  – 3:57
"Tear My Stillhouse Down"  – 4:32
"Acony Bell"  – 3:06
"Only One and Only"  – 5:33

Personnel
 Gillian Welch – vocals, guitar
 David Rawlings – guitar, vocals, bass, Optigan
 James Burton – guitar, National Steel guitar
 Armando Campean – bass
 Buddy Harman – drums
 John Hughey – pedal Steel
 Roy Huskey Jr. – bass
 Jay Joyce – E-Bow, guitar
 Jim Keltner – drums
 Greg Leisz – dobro, Weissenborn
 T Bone Burnett – Optigan

References

1996 debut albums
Gillian Welch albums
Albums produced by T Bone Burnett